Greetings from California is the debut studio album by The Madden Brothers, whose members consist of Joel and Benji Madden from pop punk band Good Charlotte, which was released on September 16, 2014 in the United States. The album's first single, "We Are Done", premiered on May 30, 2014 on 102.7 KIIS FM. The music video for the single premiered on June 30, 2014. The album was made available for pre-ordering on the iTunes Store on July 4, 2014, with "California Rain" made available for immediate download.

The album is split into two "sides". The first filled with upbeat, sunny pop rock produced by their long-time collaborator Eric Valentine, who also produced Good Charlotte's The Young and the Hopeless and The Chronicles of Life and Death. Side two is produced by Joe Chiccarelli, is inspired by  "70s-era FM pop".

Track listing

Charts

Weekly charts

Year-end charts

Release history

References

External links
 

2014 debut albums
The Madden Brothers albums
Capitol Records albums
Albums produced by Joe Chiccarelli